1913 was a particularly fruitful year for film as an art form, and is often cited one of the years in the decade which contributed to the medium the most, along with 1917. 
The year was one where filmmakers of several countries made great artistic advancements, producing notable pioneering masterpieces such as The Student of Prague (Stellan Rye), Suspense (Phillips Smalley and Lois Weber), Atlantis (August Blom), Raja Harischandra (D. G. Phalke), Juve contre Fantomas (Louis Feuillade), Quo Vadis? (Enrico Guazzoni), Ingeborg Holm (Victor Sjöström), The Mothering Heart (D. W. Griffith), Ma l’amor mio non muore! (Mario Caserini), L’enfant de Paris (Léonce Perret) and Twilight of a Woman's Soul (Yevgenii Bauer).

Events
 January 1 – The British Board of Film Censors is established.
 April 21 – The first full-length Indian (and Marathi) feature film Raja Harishchandra (silent) has its première (public release May 3).
 May – Mary Pickford signs a contract with Adolph Zukor's Famous Players Film Company for $500 per week, becoming the company's first superstar.
 Jesse L. Lasky, Cecil B. DeMille, Samuel Goldwyn and Oscar Apfel founded Jesse L. Lasky Feature Play Company.
 November 24 -  Traffic in Souls is an early example of the narrative style of Hollywood film.
 December 29 – Charlie Chaplin signs a contract with Mack Sennett to begin making films at Keystone Studios.
 December 29 – release of The Adventures of Kathlyn, the second American serial film and the first to feature cliffhanger endings that became popular with later serials.
 December 29 – production starts on Jesse L. Lasky Feature Play Company's The Squaw Man, the first full-length Hollywood feature film.
 D. W. Griffith ends his series of Biograph shorts, begun in 1908, and leaves the Biograph Company in New York City to make full-length motion pictures.
 Georges Méliès' career as a director comes to an end.
 Cines-Palast in Berlin opens as a cinema with Quo Vadis.
 Mitchell and Kenyon shoot their last known films in England.
 Roscoe "Fatty" Arbuckle signs for Mack Sennett at Keystone Studios and his early films for them feature the first known instances of pie thrown on film.

Top-grossing films (U.S.)

Films released in 1913
 Addio giovinezza!
 The Adventures of Kathlyn, (serial), starring Kathlyn Williams
 The Adventures of Three Nights (Eiko Films) 
 After Death (Italy/ Kleine & Cines) aka Dopo la Morte
 After the Welsh Rarebit, produced by Edison Films, directed by C. J. Williams, starring William Wadsworth and Ida Williams. 
 The Airman's Enemy (French/ Film de Paris)
 The Alchemist (British/ Kimenatograph) produced by Charles Urban, shot in color
 Almost an Actress (Universal) directed by Allan Curtis, starring Lon Chaney (playing a cameraman)
 American Born
 Antony and Cleopatra, directed by Enrico Guazzoni
 Arizona
 Article 47, L'
 At Midnight
 Atlantis (Danish-German co-production/ Nordisk) produced by Ole Olsen, directed by August Blom, written by Gerhardt Hauptmann, starring Olaf Fons, Ida Orloff and Ebba Thomsen; Michael Curtiz was assistant director; the first Danish full-length feature film.
 Babes in the Woods (French/ Pathe Freres) based on the fairy tale
 Back to Life (Universal) directed by Allan Dwan, starring Lon Chaney and Pauline Bush
 Balaoo the Demon Baboon aka Balaoo (French/Eclair), directed by Victorin-Hyppolite Jasset, starring Lucien Bataille and Camille Bardou, based on the novel by Gaston Leroux; this film was remade as The Wizard (1927 film) and again as Dr. Renault's Secret (1942).
 The Bangville Police, starring Mabel Normand and The Keystone Cops
 Barney Oldfield's Race for a Life, starring Mabel Normand, Mack Sennett, Ford Sterling, The Keystone Cops, and American race car driver Barney Oldfield.
 The Bartered Bride
 The Battle at Elderbush Gulch, directed by D. W. Griffith, starring Mae Marsh and Lillian Gish
 The Battle of Gettysburg
 Beautiful Bismark
 Beauty and the Beast (Universal) directed by H. C. Matthews, based on the Brothers Grimm fairy tale.
 The Bells, directed by Oscar Apfel, starring Edward P. Sullivan and Sue Balfour, based on the play The Polish Jew by Erckmann-Chatrian which was later adapted to English by Leopold Lewis retitled The Bells.
 The Bells, directed by George Lessey, produced by Thomas Edison, starring May Abbey and Robert Brower; based on the Edgar Allan Poe poem of the same name
 The Bewitched Matches (French/ Eclair) directed by Emile Cohl
 The Black Opal, (Ramo Films) based on the novel The Moonstone by Wilkie Collins
 Bloodhounds of the North (Universal) directed by Allan Dwan, starring Lon Chaney and Pauline Bush
 The Blood Red Tape of Charity (Universal) directed by Edwin August, starring Lon Chaney
 Brand of Evil (Essanay Films) directed by Harry McRae Webster, written by Edward T. Lowe, starring Thomas Commerford and Ruth Stonehouse, based on the novel The Moonstone by Wilkie Collins
 Breaking into the Big League
 The Caged Bird
 Calamity Anne's Beauty
 Calamity Anne's Dream
 Calamity Anne's Inheritance
 Calamity Anne's Vanity
 Calamity Anne, Heroine
 Caprice
 The Cave Dwellers' Romance (Bison Films)
 The Clown Hero (Imp/ Universal) written by Richard Goodall
 The Cub Reporter's Temptation
 Dante's Purgatorio (Cinema Prods.)
 David Copperfield
 David Garrick
 The Dead Man Who Killed (French/ Apex Films)
 The Dead Secret (Monopol Films) directed by Stanner E. V. Taylor, starring Marion Leonard, based on the 1857 short story of the same name by Wilkie Collins
 The Death Stone of India (Bison) directed by Milton J. Fahrney, starring William Clifford, Belle Bennett and Paul Machette, based on the 1868 Wilkie Collins novel The Moonstone.
 Death's Marathon, directed by D. W. Griffith, starring Blanche Sweet and Lionel Barrymore
 A Desperate Chance
 The Devil and Tom Walker (Selig) directed by Hardee Kirkland, written by Edward McWade, starring Harry Lonsdale and William Stowell (as Satan); based on the story by Washington Irving.
 Dr. Jekyll and Mr. Hyde (Imp/ Universal) produced by Carl Laemmle, written and directed by Herbert Brenon, starring King Baggott, Matt Snyder and Jane Gail.
 Dr. Jekyll and Mr. Hyde (British/ Kineto-Kimemacolor) produced by Charles Urban, filmed in color; this film was very sparsely distributed; one of the earliest horror films ever made in Great Britain.
 Dr. Trimball's Verdict (British/ Hepworth Films) directed by Frank Wilson, produced by Cecil M. Hepworth, starring Alec Worcester
 Don Juan's Compact (Milano Films)
 The Egyptian Mummy (Kalem Films) horror-comedy starring Ruth Roland
 Eighty Million Women Want -?
 An Elephant on his Hands (Nestor/ Universal) short comedy directed by Al Christie, starring Lon Chaney.
 L'Enfant de Paris
 Evidence of the Film
 The Evil Power (Rex Films) directed by Otis Turner, starring Margarita Fischer
 Eyes of Satan (Solax Films) 
 The Face at the Window
 Fantômas, a film serial (with parts four and five actually released in 1914):
 À l'ombre de la guillotine 
 Juve contre Fantômas
 Le Mort qui tue
 Faust and the Lily (Biograph) a satirical take on Goethe's "Faust"
 Feathertop (British/ Kinemacolor) produced by Charles Urban, filmed in Color;  based on the novel by Nathaniel Hawthorne (remade in 1916)
 The Fire Coward
 The Flirt and the Bandit
 For Her Boy's Sake
 For the Crown
 For the Flag
 For the Peace of Bear Valley
 The Foreman's Treachery (Edison Prods.) directed by Charles Brabin, starring Miriam Nesbitt and Marc MacDermott
 A Forest Romance
 From the Beyond (French/ U.S. co-production, Eclair Films/ American Standard) directed by Oscar A. C. Lund, starring Alec B. Francis and Barbara Tennant
 Funnicus and the Ghost (Eclair Films)
 The Game Warden
 The Ghost (Victor Films) directed by (and starring) James Kirkwood 
 The Ghost of Seaview Manor (Dragon Prods.) 
 The Ghost of the Hacienda, a horror-western hybrid directed by Thomas Ricketts, starring Edward Coxen and Jean Durrell  
 The Ghost of the White Lady, aka The White Ghost (Denmark/ Great Northern & Nordisk) starring Rita Sacchetto 
 The Ghosts: or, Who's Afraid? (Vitagraph) directed by William J. Bauman, starring Myrtle Gonzalez and George Cooper
 The Girl and the Greaser
 The Grasshopper and the Ant
 The Greater Love
 The Great Ganton Mystery (Rex Films) 
 The Great Physician (Edison Prods.) directed by Richard Ridgely, starring Charles Ogle
 The Green Eye of the Yellow God (Edison Prods.) directed by Richard Ridgely, starring Charles Ogle, based on the 1911 poem by J. Milton Hayes
 The Gusher, directed by Mack Sennett, starring Mabel Normand, Ford Sterling, Charles Inslee, and The Keystone Cops
 Hamlet
 The Haunted Bedroom (Edison) starring Harry Beaumont, Jack Strong and Mabel Trunelle
 The Haunted Chamber (Anderson Films) thought to be based on the 1873 poem by Henry Wadsworth Longfellow
 The Haunted Cottage,  aka Le cottage hantee (French/ Pathe) written and directed by Segundo de Chomon
 The Haunted House, directed by Lorimer Johnston, starring Vivian Rich and Jack Richardson
 The Haunted House (Kalem Films) thought to be directed by Edmund Lawrence, starring Edgar L. Davenport, Adelaide Lawrence and Olive Temple
 The Haunted House (Patheplay) starring Charles E. Bunnell, Crane Wilbur and Julia Walcott
 The Heart of a Fool
 Her Big Story
 Her Gallant Knights
 Hinemoa
 His Neighbor's Wife
 His Wife's Child
 The House in the Tree
 The House of Darkness, directed by D. W. Griffith, starring Lillian Gish and Lionel Barrymore
 The Idol of Bonanza Camp
 In the Bishop's Carriage
 In the Firelight
 In the Grip of a Charlatan (Kalem Film) starring Alice Joyce and Tom Moore
 In the Grip of the Vampire (French/ Gaumont) directed by Leonce Perret; does not feature a supernatural vampire
 In the Long Ago (Selig Polyscope) directed by Colin Campbell, starring Wheeler Oakman and Tom Santschi
 In the Mountains of Virginia
 In the Power of a Hypnotist (Warner) directed by Sidney Olcott and T. Hayes Hunter, starring Sydney Olcott and Gene Gauntier
 In the Toils of the Devil (Italy/ Milano Film) story was based on Faust
 The Influence of a Child
 Ingeborg Holm, once described as the first "realistic" feature film
 The Island of Bliss (German/ Brandon Films) directed by Arthur Kahane; based on a Max Reinhardt play
 The Island of Terror (French/ Eclipse) directed by Joe Hamman (who also starred in it); an unauthorized film version of the 1896 H. G. Wells novel The Island of Dr. Moreau, made without Wells' permission.
 Isle of the Dead (Denmark/ Gluckstadt Films) directed by Wilhelm Gluckstadt 
 It Is Never Too Late to Mend (Thomas Edison) directed by Charles M. Seay, starring Walter Edwin, Mary Fuller, Wyatt Burns and Charles Ogle, based on the 1856 Charles Reade novel of the same name
Ivanhoe
 Justice of the Wild
 A Lady of Quality
 The Lady Killer
 The Last Days of Pompeii, directed by Mario Caserini and Eleuterio Rodolfi (One of the early blockbusters in cinema.  One of the earliest feature films.)
 Love From Out of the Grave (French/ Film d'Art) a lost film. 
 Mabel's Awful Mistakes, starring Mabel Normand and Mack Sennett
 Mabel's Dramatic Career, starring Mack Sennett, Ford Sterling, and The Keystone Cops; contains early usage of film-within-a-film
 Mabel's New Hero, directed by Mack Sennett, starring Mabel Normand, Fatty Arbuckle, and The Keystone Cops
 The Magic Skin (Victor Films) starring J. Warren Kerrigan, based on the story The Wild Ass's Skin by Balzac.
 The Man in the White Cloak (Denmark/ Nordisk) 
 The Man of the Wax Figures (French), directed by Maurice Tourneur, aka L'Homme aux Figures de Cire
 Maria Marten: or, The Murder in the Red Barn (British/ Motograph Films) written and directed by Maurice Elvey, starring Elizabeth Risdon, Nessie Blackford and Fred Groves; script incorporated ideas from several different stage play versions of the story;  remade in 1928 and again in 1935. 
 The Medium's Nemesis (Thanhauser Films) starring Mrs. Lawrence Marston, Sidney Bracey and Marie Eline 
 The Mirror
 A Mix-Up in Pedigrees
 Moondyne
 The Mothering Heart, directed by D. W. Griffith, starring Lillian Gish
 Mrs. Carter's Campaign
 The Mysterious Stranger (Essanay Films) starring Bryant Washburn and E. H. Calvert. 
 Mystery of the Haunted Hotel (Thanhouser)
 The Mystic Moonstone (British/ Lion's Head Films) directed by David Aylott 
 The New Conductor
 The Newsboy's Christmas Dream (British/ C&M Films) 
 The Night Before Christmas
 Notre Dame (Patheplay), based on the novel Notre Dame de Paris by Victor Hugo
 Nursery Favorites
 The Oath of Pierre
 The Occult, directed by Allan Dwan, starring Sydney Ayres, Jacques Jaccard and Violet Knights.
 The Other (Der Andere) aka Der Andere (German/ Vitascope), written and directed by Max Mack, starring Albert Basserman, Hanni Weisse and Emmerich Hanus; based on a stage play by Paul Lindau which in turn was inspired by the novel Dr. Jekyll and Mr. Hyde 
 The Oath of Tsuru San
 Our Wives
 Owana, the Devil Woman (Nestor Films) produced by David Horseley 
 Personal Magnetism
 The Phantom Signal (Thomas Edison Prods.) directed by George Lessey, starring Charles Ogle, Mary Abbey and Bessie Learn. 
 The Picture of Dorian Gray (1913 film), written by Lois Weber, directed by Phillips Smalley; starring Wallace Reid and Lois Weber; based on the famous novel by Oscar Wilde.
 The Pied Piper of Hamlin (Edison Prods.) directed by George Lessey, starring Herbert Prior and Robert Brower.
 The Pit and the Pendulum, aka Rivals (Solax Films) directed by Alice Guy-Blache, starring Darwin Karr;  based on the short story by Edgar Allan Poe. 
 Poisoned Waters (Nestor Films/ Universal) directed by Milton J. Fahrney, produced by David Horsley, starring Valleria Alison and Louis Fitzroy 
 Poor Jake's Demise (Imp/ Universal) directed by Allen Curtis, starring Lon Chaney (his first credited film appearance).
 The Proof of the Man
 The Pursuit of the Smugglers
 The Queen of Spades (Italy/ Cines, Aquila) directed by Baldassare Negroni, starring Leda Gys, Hesperia and Ignazio Lupi; based on the story by Alexander Pushkin and its 1890 opera adaptation by Tchaikovsky. 
 The Queen of Spades (Fidelity Films) based on the story by Alexander Pushkin; a lost film. 
 Quicksands
Quo Vadis?, directed by Enrico Guazzoni (One of the earliest feature films.)
 Raja Harishchandra, often listed as the first Indian feature film
 Red Margaret, Moonshiner 
 The Reformers, or the Lost Art of Minding One's Own Business, directed by D. W. Griffith
 The Reincarnation of a Soul (Universal) starring Edwin August
 The Restless Spirit (Victor/ Universal) directed by Allan Dwan, starring Lon Chaney and Pauline Bush
 Rick's Redemption
 The Roadside Inn (French/ Star Film)
 The Rose of San Juan
 Sapho
 Satan's Castle (Italy/ Ambrosio) plot similar to "Faust"
 A Sawmill Hazard
 Scrooge (British/ Big Features) directed by Leedham Bantock, starring Sir Seymour Hicks (who also wrote the screenplay); based on the Charles Dickens novel A Christmas Carol.
 The Sea Urchin (1913 film) (Universal) directed by Edwin August, starring Lon Chaney and Jeanie MacPherson
 The Sea Wolf, based on the novel by Jack London
 The Scimitar of the Prophet
Sherlock Holmes Solves the Sign of the Four (Thanhouser, U.S., 2 reels) starring Harry Benham as Holmes; film was released in U.K. as The Sign of Four
 The Shoemaker and the Doll
 Shon the Piper (Universal) starring Robert Z. Leonard and Lon Chaney (uncredited)
 The Shriner's Daughter
 Simple Simon and the Haunted House, aka Onesime et la maison hante (French/ Gaumont) directed by Jean Durand, starring Ernest Bourbon and Gaston Modot; one in a series of more than 60 French silent films featuring the character Onesime (which means Simple Simon in English). 
 Simple Simon and the Suicide Club (French/ Gaumont) directed by Jean Durand, starring Ernest Bourbon and Gaston Modot;  a comic satire on Robert Louis Stevenson's 1878 novel, The Suicide Club. 
 Il sire di Vincigliata
 Sleeping Beauty (Venus/ Warners) based on the Perrault fairy tale.
 Snow White (Powers Films) based on the Brothers Grimm fairy tale.
 Some Fools There Were
 The Spectre of Jago (Italy/ Savoia Films) directed by Alberto Carlo Lolli, starring Ubaldo Maria Del Colle;  based on the novel by Charles Darlington. 
 The Speed Kings, starring Mabel Normand, Fatty Arbuckle, Ford Sterling and American race car drivers Teddy Tetzlaff, Earl Cooper and Barney Oldfield.
 The Speed Queen, starring Mabel Normand
 The Spell (Power Picture Plays) plot was similar to "Svengali". 
 The Spender
 The Star of India (Blache Films) directed by Herbert Blache and Alice Guy-Blache, starring Frannie Fraunholz and Claire Whitney; based on the 1868 novel The Moonstone by Wilkie Collins 
 Strangers from Nowhere, aka Two Strangers from Nowhere (Blache Films) produced by Herbert Blache; plot was similar to "Faust". 
 The Student of Prague (Germany/Denmark) produced by Apex/ Deutsch-Bioscop, directed by Stellan Rye and Paul Wegener, written by Hanns Heinz Ewers, starring Paul Wegener, John Gottowt, Grete Berger and Lyda Salmonova; adapting the 1839 Edgar Allan Poe story William Wilson, the film explored the concept of the "doppelganger"; only inferior prints exist, edited down from 85 minutes to 41 minutes; the film was remade in 1926 and again in 1935. 
 The Suicide Club (German/ Eichberg Films) directed by Joseph Delmont, starring Fred Sauer and Ilse Bois; based on the 1878 Robert Louis Stevenson short story of the same name. 
 Suspense, directed by Lois Weber; contains early usage of split-screen
 The Tale of the Ticker
 The Tempter (British) filmed in Color;  directed by F. Martin Thornton and R. H. Callum, produced by Charles Urban, starring Harry Agar Lyons and Alfred de Manby; an early anthology fantasy film that predated Dead of Night (1945). 
 The Tenderfoot's Ghost (produced by Frontier Films/ St. Louis Motion Picture Co.) 
 The Thief and the Porter's Head (Italy/ Milano Film)  
 Through the Neighbor's Window
 Through the Sluice Gates
 Traffic in Souls, directed by George Loane Tucker (One of the earliest American feature film.)
 Transported
 The Trap (Universal) directed by Edwin August, starring Lon Chaney and Cleo Madison
 Trapped in a Forest Fire
 The Treasure of Buddha (Gerrard Studios) lost film based on the 1868 Wilkie Collins novel, The Moonstone. 
 Trilby (Vitascope) yet another film based on the 1894 novel by George du Maurier. 
 Truth in the Wilderness
 Twilight of a Woman's Soul
 Unto the Third Generation
 The Unwelcome Guest
 The Vampire (British/ Searchlight Films) remade in 1915 as Heba, the Snake Woman. 
 The Vampire (U.S./ Kalem Films) directed by Robert G. Vignola, starring Harry Millarde,  Marguerite Cortot, Alice Eis and Bert French; print exists in a museum.
 The Vampire of the Desert (Vitagraph) directed by Charles Gaskill, starring Helen Gardner and Teffi Johnson; a non-supernatural film based on a poem called The Vampire by Rudyard Kipling 
 Voodoo Fires (Tampa Films) directed by Frank Whitman, written by Joe Brandt; one of the earliest films to depict voodoo rituals, quite possibly an influence on the later Bela Lugosi film, White Zombie (1932).
 Wamba, a Child of the Jungle
 The Werewolf (U.S./ Bison Films, Universal) first known film to deal with the "werewolf" concept; filmed in Canada, directed by Henry McRae, written by Ruth Ann Baldwin, starring Clarence Barton, Marie Walcamp and Phyllis Gordon; based on an 1898 story called "The Werewolves" by Honore Beaugrand; the last known print was destroyed in a fire in 1924. 
 What the Gods Decree (French/ Eclair) directed by Victorin-Hippolyte Jasset, starring Charles Krauss and Josette Andriot (a statue of Kali comes to life). 
 When Lincoln Paid
 When Spirits Walk (Frontier/ St. Louis) starring Lloyd Hamilton, Joseph Franz and Eva Thatcher 
 While John Bolt Slept (Edison Films) starring Charles Ogle 
 While There's Life
 The Witch of Salem, directed by Raymond B. West, produced by Thomas H. Ince, starring Charles Ray and Clara Williams; plot is similar to D. W. Griffith's Rose O'Salem Town (1910). 
 Woman's Honor
 Yoshiwara Kaidan: Kozakura Choji (Nikkatsu Kyoto Studios) Japanese ghost movie directed by Shozo Makino, starring Matsunosuke Onoe 
 Zhuangzi Tests His Wife, the earliest feature film of Hong Kong cinema

Short film series
Broncho Billy Anderson (1910–1916)
Harold Lloyd (1913–1921)

Births
January 2 – Anna Lee, actress (died 2004)
January 6 – Loretta Young, actress (died 2000)
January 15
Lloyd Bridges, actor (died 1998)
Patricia Farr, actress (died 1948)
January 29 – Victor Mature, actor (died 1999)
February 8 – Betty Field, actress (died 1973)
February 10 – Douglas Slocombe, cinematographer (died 2016)
February 25
Jim Backus, actor (died 1989)
Gert Fröbe, actor (died 1988)
March 2 – Marjorie Weaver, actress (died 1994)
March 3 - Harold J. Stone, actor died (died 2005)
March 4 – John Garfield, actor (died 1952)
March 15 – Macdonald Carey, actor (died 1994)
March 18 – René Clément, director (died 1996)
April 16 – Les Tremayne, English-American actor (died 2003)
May 6 – Stewart Granger, actor (died 1993)
May 8
Sid James, actor and comedian (died 1976)
Charles Scorsese, American actor (died 1993)
May 10 – Maria Dominiani, actress (died 2021)
May 18 – Mary Howard de Liagre, actress (died 2009)
May 25 - Benjamin Melniker, American producer (died 2018)
May 26 – Peter Cushing, actor (died 1994)
May 27
Willie Best, actor (died 1962)
Linden Travers, actress (died 2001)
July 4 – Barbara Weeks, actress (died 2003)
July 10 – Joan Marsh, actress (died 2000)
July 18 
Marvin Miller, American actor (died 1985) 
Red Skelton, actor, comedian (died 1997)
July 29 – Gale Page, actress (died 1983)
August 10 – Noah Beery Jr., actor (died 1994)
August 11 – Paul Dupuis, actor (died 1976)
August 13 – Rita Johnson, actress (died 1965)
August 24 – Dorothy Comingore, actress (died 1971)
September 3 – Alan Ladd, actor (died 1964)
September 5 - Kathleen Burke, actress (died 1980
September 6 – Julie Gibson, actress (died 2019)
September 7 – Anthony Quayle, actor (died 1989)
September 12 – Gerardo de Leon, Filipino director, actor, screenwriter, producer (died 1981)
September 19 – Frances Farmer, actress (died 1970)
September 29 
Trevor Howard, actor (died 1988)
Stanley Kramer, producer, director (died 2001)
September 30 – Bill Walsh, producer, writer (died 1975)
October 7 – Evelyn Venable, actress (died 1993)
October 10 – Janis Carter, actress (died 1994)
October 17 – Robert Lowery, actor (died 1971)
November 2 – Burt Lancaster, actor (died 1994)
November 4 – Gig Young, actor (died 1978)
November 5
Guy Green, cinematographer (died 2005)
Vivien Leigh, actress (died 1967)
John McGiver, actor (died 1975)
November 13 – Alexander Scourby, American actor (died 1985)
November 16 - Ellen Albertini Dow, American character actress (died 2015)
November 20 – Judy Canova, actress (died 1983)
November 24 
Howard Duff, actor (died 1990)
Geraldine Fitzgerald, actress (died 2005)
December 1 – Mary Martin, actress (died 1990)
December 25 – Tony Martin, singer, actor (died 2012)

Deaths
 March 15 – John R. Cumpson, stage and film actor (b. 1866)
 June 2 – Eleanor Caines,  silent film actress (b. 1880) 
 August 3 – Joseph Graybill, actor with D.W. Griffith (b. 1887)

Film debuts
 Wallace Beery – His Athletic Wife (short)
 Gladys Brockwell – His Blind Power
 Lon Chaney – Poor Jake's Demise
 Minnie Maddern Fiske – Tess of the d'Urbervilles
 Al St. John – A Noise from the Deep
 Lillie Langtry – His Neighbor's Wife
 Harold Lloyd – The Old Monk's Tale (short) (uncredited) 
 Cissie Loftus – A Lady of Quality
 Eugene Pallette – The Fugitive (1913 short) (uncredited)
 Paul Wegener – Der Verfuhrte

References

 
Film by year